Terminal Station may refer to:

terminals of train stations

Specific places
Birmingham Terminal Station, formerly in Birmingham, Alabama 1909–1969
Ferry Terminal Station, in Suminoe-ku, Osaka, Japan
Norfolk Terminal Station, formerly in Norfolk, Virginia 1912–1963
Terminal Station (Atlanta), a former union station in downtown Atlanta, Georgia 1905–1970
Terminal Station (Macon, Georgia), built in 1916 and located in the Macon Historic District
Terminal Station (Hutchinson, Kansas), listed on the NRHP in Kansas
Terminal Station (Chattanooga), listed on the NRHP in Tennessee

Film
Terminal Station (film), a 1953 film

See also
Domestic Terminal railway station (disambiguation)